Rathayibacter tritici is a Gram-positive soil bacterium. It is a plant pathogen and causes spike blight in wheat.

References

External links
Type strain of Rathayibacter tritici at BacDive -  the Bacterial Diversity Metadatabase

Microbacteriaceae
Soil biology
Bacteria described in 1982